”Rondel” is a song written by the English composer Edward Elgar in 1894 as his Op.16, No.3.  The words are by Longfellow, a translation of a Rondel by Froissart. The manuscript is dated 4 January 1894.

The song was first performed by Charles Phillips in St. James's Hall on 7 December 1897.

The song was first published in 1896, by Ascherberg. It was re-published in 1907 as one of the Seven Lieder of Edward Elgar, with English and German words.

Lyrics

German words by Ed. Sachs.

 Elgar reversed the positions of "sure" and "fixed" in the second line

Recordings
Songs and Piano Music by Edward Elgar has "Rondel"  performed by Mark Wilde (tenor), with David Owen Norris (piano).
The Songs of Edward Elgar SOMM CD 220 Neil Mackie (tenor) with Malcolm Martineau (piano), at Southlands College, London, April 1999

References

Banfield, Stephen, Sensibility and English Song: Critical studies of the early 20th century (Cambridge University Press, 1985) 
Kennedy, Michael, Portrait of Elgar (Oxford University Press, 1968) 
Moore, Jerrold N. “Edward Elgar: a creative life” (Oxford University Press, 1984) 

Songs by Edward Elgar
1894 songs
Musical settings of poems by Henry Wadsworth Longfellow